The A125 highway is a highway in Nigeria. It is one of the east-west roads linking the main south-north roads. (It is named from the two highways it links).

It runs from the A1 highway at Kontagora, Niger State to the A2 highway to the north of Kaduna.

References

Highways in Nigeria